Choleva is a genus of beetles belonging to the family Leiodidae.

The genus was first described by Latreille in 1796.

Species:
 Choleva agilis
 Choleva angustata
 Choleva cisteloides
 Choleva elongata
 Choleva fagniezi
 Choleva glauca
 Choleva lederiana
 Choleva oblonga
 Choleva spinipennis
 Choleva sturmii

References

Leiodidae